The northern free-tailed bat (Chaerephon johorensis) is a species of bat in the family Molossidae. It is found in Indonesia and Malaysia.

Taxonomy and etymology
It was described as a new species in 1873 by Irish zoologist George Edward Dobson. Dobson had obtained the holotype from James Wood-Mason. Dobson initially placed it in the genus Molossus and the subgenus Nyctinomus, with a scientific name of Molossus (Nyctinomus) johorensis. Its species name "johorensis" is Latin for "belonging to Johor." Johor is a state in Malaysia; the holotype was collected there.

Description
Its ears are large and round. Its tragi are small and squarish in shape. Its ears are connected to each other by a band of tissue called the interaural membrane. As a free-tailed bat, its tail extends beyond the uropatagium.

Conservation
It is currently listed as vulnerable by the IUCN. It meets the criteria for this designation because its population have declined by more than 30% from 2004–2014.

References

Chaerephon (bat)
Mammals described in 1873
Taxonomy articles created by Polbot
Bats of Southeast Asia
Taxa named by George Edward Dobson